"Atlas" is a song by the American experimental rock band Battles. The song is the second track of Battles' debut album Mirrored, and was released as the lead single on April 2, 2007. "Atlas" received critical acclaim and was included on many critics' year-end and decade-end best songs lists. It was included in the video games LittleBigPlanet and Major League Baseball 2K8. The song was also used by Dodge for their advertisement of the 2013 Dodge Dart, by Quicken Loans during their Super Bowl 50 commercial for their advertisement of their "Rocket Mortgage" program, and in 2021 by Ford in their Ford F-150 Lightning electric pickup announcement advertisement.

Accolades

Track listing

References

2007 singles
2007 songs
Battles (band) songs